Larry Beckett (born April 4, 1947) is an American poet, songwriter, musician, and literary critic. As a songwriter and music arranger, Beckett collaborated with Tim Buckley in the late 1960s and early 1970s on several songs and albums, including the critically acclaimed "Song to the Siren" which has been recorded by many artists, from This Mortal Coil to Robert Plant. He has also collaborated with British group The Long Lost Band, and local Portland indie band Eyelids.

Beckett has had several books of poetry published including Songs and Sonnets, Beat Poetry, and a few book-length poems entitled Paul Bunyan, Wyatt Earp, and Amelia Earhart. American Cycle, a 47-year project, will be published in April 2021 by Running Wild Press.

Early life
Beckett was born in Glendale, California where his father was an English and speech teacher and his mother worked in the career counseling industry.  The Becketts moved around for the first decade of Larry Beckett's life, first to Ashland, Oregon, then back down south to Downey, California and eventually settling in nearby Anaheim when Larry was 10 years old. Larry Beckett attended Loara High School where he developed a passion for writing and poetry. A high school English teacher helped change his mind from thinking he wanted to be a mathematical physicist, to realizing he was a writer. Also while in high school Larry Beckett befriended classmates Tim Buckley and Jim Fielder, a relationship that would launch Beckett into music songwriting.

Poetry 

Beckett read two of his 1966 poems, Found at the Scene of a Rendezvous that Failed, and Birth Day, on the Rhino Handmade reissue of the album Tim Buckley, to which he contributed liner notes, including the lyric “1, 2, 3.” He recited Song to the Siren and an essay on its composition on the MVDvisual DVD Tim Buckley: My Fleeting House.

Beckett's lyrics and poems were published in Songs and Sonnets, 2002, by Rainy Day Women Press.

Beat Poetry, with twelve central San Francisco renaissance poems and Beckett’s essays on them reconsidered as literature, was published in 2012. The Jack Kerouac chapter was reprinted in the 2019 anthology Kerouac on Record: A Literary Soundtrack, edited by Simon Warner and Jim Sampas.

For 47 years, Beckett worked on American Cycle, a series of long poems: U. S. Rivers: Highway 1, Old California, Paul Bunyan, John Henry (folklore), Chief Joseph, Wyatt Earp, P. T. Barnum, Amelia Earhart, Blue Ridge, U. S. Rivers: Route 66. The Cycle's themes are love, local mythology, history, justice, memory, accomplishment, time. Paul Bunyan, Wyatt Earp, and Amelia Earhart were published as individual volumes, Paul Bunyan with a recording of a performance. American Cycle is to be published in 2021.

Translations 

Beckett's translations include The Way of Rain, a reconstruction of the lost order of the Tao Te Ching; Poems After Li Po,; Poems After Li Shang-yin; The Wisewoman's Song, from the Poetic Edda; The Logos, by Heraclitus; East-West Divan, by Johann Goethe; Heroic Sonnets, by José-Maria de Heredia.

Songwriting

With Tim Buckley
Beckett, Buckley, and Fielder frequented Hollywood together where they were introduced to the area's art and music scene. Buckley and Beckett started writing together in the mid-1960s as members of Southern California rock band The Bohemians, with Buckley on rhythm guitar, Brian Hartzel on lead guitar, Beckett on drums, and Jim Fielder (later of Blood, Sweat & Tears) on bass. They recorded a demo for Elektra Records, I Can't See You, but the company was only interested in Buckley as a solo artist, not the group.

Beckett contributed to Buckley's first two albums, Tim Buckley and Goodbye and Hello, both as co-songwriter and as a collaborator on arrangements. The lyrics Beckett wrote, such as "No Man Can Find the War", "Morning Glory" and "Song to the Siren", were characterized by their literary tone. The title track of Goodbye and Hello was originally constructed by Beckett as a piece in which two voices would sing different words and melodies.

Beckett and Buckley resumed their songwriting partnership for Starsailor in 1970, and Beckett was sporadically involved in Buckley's later work until Buckley's death in 1975.

Other collaborations

In 2014, Beckett began working with a group of musicians from Lancaster, England, The Long Lost Band.  He toured with them in the UK in 2015, and contributed poetry and song lyrics to a full-length studio album, One More Mile. The presence of Larry Beckett in the UK was covered in an extensive feature in Record Collector magazine  which also covered his relationship with Buckley.  Beckett continued his working relationship with Stuart Anthony of The Long Lost Band in 2018, releasing a full-length album Love & Trial.

An admirer of the 5-piece Portland indie band Eyelids, powered by singer-songwriters Chris Slusarenko, from Guided by Voices, and John Moen, of The Decemberists, Beckett began a collaboration with the band by opening his book of songs to them. Beckett also wrote new lyrics. The resulting album, The Accidental Falls, produced by Peter Buck, from R.E.M., made several Best of 2020 lists. The album includes the lost 1966 Beckett/Buckley song "Found at the Scene of a Rendezvous That Failed" with Beckett on piano and Buck on bass.

Personal life 

Beckett has remained a poet and songwriter while working as a computer programmer and analyst, based in Portland, Oregon. 
He is married to photographer Laura Fletcher and they have two children - Susannah Beckett (born 1990) and Liam Beckett (born 1999).

References

External links
American Cycle
 Reviews in Brief - Songs and Sonnets by Larry Beckett, 2002
 Reflections from Shadow Interview, 2004
 Tom Clark essay on Morning-Glory, 2010
 Tom Clark comment on Second Avenue, 2012
Beat Poetry Book Review by Lydia Pyne 2012
 A Careful Reading of a Literature's Underdog: Larry Beckett's Beat Poetry, 2013
Beat Poetry review by Ryder Miller 2013
20 Questions: Larry Beckett 2015
Walking on the Clouds - Interview 2015
Paul Bunyan Book Review 2015
 An American Epic Larry Beckett's Paul Bunyan 2017
 Flight Patterns: Q&A with 'Amelia Earhart' Author Larry Beckett 2018
 I Guess it Must Be Up to Me: Larry Beckett's Western Cries, and Whispers 2020

1947 births
Living people
Songwriters from California
Poets from California
Writers from Glendale, California
Musicians from Anaheim, California
Musicians from Glendale, California
American poets
American male writers